Dumbarton Express is a regional public transit service in the San Francisco Bay Area connecting Alameda, San Mateo, and Santa Clara Counties via the Dumbarton Bridge, the system's namesake. The bus service is funded by a consortium of five transit agencies (AC Transit, BART, SamTrans, Union City Transit, and VTA). Dumbarton Express is administered by AC Transit and operated under contract by MV Transportation.

AC Transit also operates bus service across the Dumbarton Bridge on Route U, which connects Fremont BART and Stanford University. Route U is not part of the Dumbarton Express system.

Service area 
Dumbarton Express serves the cities of Menlo Park, Newark, Palo Alto, and Union City.

Hubs 
Service is provided to two major transit hubs: Palo Alto station (connections to Caltrain, SamTrans, VTA) and Union City station (connections to AC Transit, BART and Union City Transit). Both lines additionally serve Ardenwood Park & Ride.

Routes 
As of December 12, 2012, Dumbarton Express operates two routes:

Dumbarton Express has an "open door" policy that allows passengers to ride locally in the East Bay and Peninsula, without crossing the bridge.

Fares and transfer policies

Fares 
Fares can be paid with cash (exact change only) and Clipper cards, and are identical to the AC Transit fare structure.

Cash fares

Clipper fares 

Note: Local travel is within the East Bay or Peninsula only; Transbay travel is across the Dumbarton Bridge.

Transfers and passes 
Dumbarton Express accepts transfers and passes from several connecting transit agencies for full or partial fare.

VTA Express Eco Passes and AC Transit Transbay 31-Day Passes are accepted as full Transbay fare.

The following are accepted as full local fare or partial Transbay fare:
 AC Transit local 31-day passes
 Caltrain monthly passes
 SamTrans monthly passes
 Union City Transit passes
 VTA day or monthly passes

BART-to-bus transfers are accepted as full local fare but not as partial Transbay fare. As of January 1, 2013, BART Plus tickets are not accepted.

Transfers issued by Dumbarton Express are valid for 2 hours and are accepted by AC Transit, SamTrans, Union City Transit, and VTA. Union City Transit has a $0.25 surcharge, payable on board Union City Transit. Transfers to SamTrans are valid only for passengers using Clipper cards.

Future expansion 
On August 2, 2017, SamTrans, one of the five transit agencies that jointly operate the Dumbarton Express, released a study that examined the feasibility of adding additional bus routes to the service. The study recommended two new bus routes: an express bus route traveling between the Union City BART station to the Redwood City Caltrain station, and a local bus route between the Union City BART station to job centers in northern Mountain View and Sunnyvale, the introduction of which would lead to a 34% increase in ridership. The study also reiterated SamTrans' ultimate goal of reintroducing rail service across the Dumbarton Rail Bridge, ultimately connecting the Redwood City Caltrain station to the Union City BART station via conventional passenger rail.

See also 
List of AC Transit routes serving the Dumbarton Bridge

References

External links 
 The Dumbarton Express

Bus transportation in California
Public transportation in Alameda County, California
Public transportation in Santa Clara County, California